Čilpah (in older sources also Cilpah, locally Čilpoh) is a small settlement to the southwest of Trebelno in the Municipality of Mokronog-Trebelno in southeastern Slovenia. The area is part of the traditional region of Lower Carniola. The municipality is now included in the Southeast Slovenia Statistical Region.

References

External links
Čilpah on Geopedia

Populated places in the Municipality of Mokronog-Trebelno